The boys' tournament at the 2018 Summer Youth Olympics was held at the Parque Polideportivo Roca from 7 to 14 October 2018.

Results
All times are Argentina Time (UTC-03:00)

Preliminary round

Pool A

Pool B

Final round

Eleventh place game

Ninth place game

Quarterfinals

5–8th place RD4

Semifinals

Seventh place game

Fifth place game

Bronze medal game

Gold medal game

Statistics

Final ranking

Goalscorers

References

Field hockey at the 2018 Summer Youth Olympics